Tutu Plantation House in the Tutu subdistrict of St. Thomas, U.S. Virgin Islands, was built in 1813.  It was listed on the National Register of Historic Places in 1976. The listing included two contributing buildings.

It was deemed significant as one of few plantation greathouses surviving on St. Thomas.  It is a two-story  building with a hipped roof.  Its interior has Greek Revival trim dating from 20 to 30 years after the house's construction, which was perhaps in about 1803.

The word tutu, in Danish, means a trumpet-like conch shell which was used to call the slaves to work.

References

Houses in the United States Virgin Islands
Plantations in the Danish West Indies
Tutu, U.S. Virgin Islands
Plantation houses in the United States
Sugar plantations in Saint Thomas, U.S. Virgin Islands
Houses completed in 1813
Houses on the National Register of Historic Places in the United States Virgin Islands
1813 establishments in North America
1810s establishments in the Caribbean
1810s establishments in Denmark
19th century in the Danish West Indies